This is a list of Ministers of Internal affairs of the Republic of Cyprus since the independence in 1960:

Notes:
1Since 1964 was also Defence Minister.
2Also Defence Minister.

See also 

 Ministry of Interior (Cyprus)

External links 
 Official list on the Web site of the Ministry 

Internal affairs
 

el:Υπουργείο Εσωτερικών (Κύπρος)